The 2008 Big South Conference men's basketball tournament took place March 4–8, 2008.

Format
The semifinals were held at the Justice Center in Asheville, North Carolina. The quarterfinals and finals were held at the home court of the better seed.

Bracket

References

Tournament
Big South Conference men's basketball tournament
Big South Conference men's basketball tournament
Big South Conference men's basketball tournament